Kuno Gonschior (10 September 1933 in Wanne-Eickel – 16 March 2010 in Bochum) was a German painter.

From 1957 to 1961, Gonschior studied painting at the Kunstakademie Düsseldorf. In 1959, he was one of the first students of Karl Otto Götz, his classmates being Gotthard Graubner and HA Schult. From 1961 to 1963 he studied at the University of Cologne. In 1972, he became lecturer at the Pädagogische Hochschule Münster. From 1982 to 2000, he was a professor of painting at the Hochschule für Bildende Künste Berlin.

Gonschior's early work with its intuitive, almost monochrome strokes of the brush was influenced by Götz's abstract style. Later, during the 1960s, he created paintings out of characteristic dots placed next to each other, combining fluorescent, complementary colors such as red and green. As a result, extreme vibrations are triggered in the human eye. He also painted large, abstract landscapes merging and melting thick paint in rich colors. Furthermore, he was inspired by the color theories of Josef Albers. From 1968, he created colored multi-room installations.

In 1977, the artist participated in the documenta 6 in Kassel. After that date, he primarily exhibited in the USA and in Japan. In 1999, he received the Deutscher Kritikerpreis.

References

Further reading 
 Werner Streletz, "Kuno Gonschior – der Forscher auf dem Feld der Farbe", Westdeutsche Allgemeine Zeitung, March 17, 2010.
 Walter Smerlin, ed., Kuno Gonschior:  Nur für Dich und mich / Just For You And Me, exhibition catalog, Museum Küppersmühle für Moderne Kunst, Duisburg, 2008.
 John William Gabriel, Malerei – Kuno Gonschior, Bönen 2003.
 Wolfgang Zemter, ed., Kuno Gonschior, Bönen 2000.
 Ingo Bartsch and Lucie Schauer, eds., Kuno Gonschior, exhibition catalog, Museum am Ostwall, Dortmund, 1990.
 Jens Christian Jensen, Kuno Gonschior: Bilder 1971 - 1976. Kunsthalle Kiel 1977.
 Rolf Wedewer, Kuno Gonschior : Werkstatt, 1. Leverkusen 1971.

External links 
Kuno Gonschior at Galerie m Bochum
Leesha McKenny, "Visual Art", Arts and Entertainment, July, 26-27, 2008
Museumsplattform NRW: Kuno Gonschior.
Sammlung Steinle: Das Kunstwerk des Monats Oktober 2015: Kuno Gonschior, VIBRATION ROT-GR-BLAU-VIO.

1933 births
2010 deaths
Artists from North Rhine-Westphalia
Kunstakademie Düsseldorf alumni
German contemporary artists
People from Herne, North Rhine-Westphalia